Monochamus variegatus is a species of beetle in the family Cerambycidae. It was described by Per Olof Christopher Aurivillius in 1925.

References

variegatus
Beetles described in 1925